Qiandeng is a town in Kunshan, Suzhou, Jiangsu, China. , it has 12 residential communities and 16 villages under its administration. It is located 15 kilometers south of Kunshan city and borders Qingpu District, Shanghai on its east side. Qiandeng has an area of 84km2 and a population of about 130,000 people. 

Qiandeng has a rich cultural heritage. It was the native place of Gu Jian, the founder of Kunqu. It was also the birthplace of the famous Ming dynasty writer Gu Yanwu. Qiandeng is now a national historical and cultural town in China, as well as a national 4A grade scenic destination.

History
Qiandeng was called Qiandun since the Ming dynasty. It was renamed Qiandun village in 1910, established as a township in 1950, and changed to its present name in 2003.

Gu Jian Museum
Gu Jian Museum commemorates Gu Jian (顧堅,  14th century?), the founder of Kunqu. It is located at the west bank of Qiandeng river.

Former residence of Gu Yanwu
The former residence of Gu Yanwu was built by Gu Yanwu's grand father, it was destroyed by Japanese pirates, later rebuilt. It is a Ming Dynasty style building complex with formal sitting room, dining room, study and a garden. Gu Yanwu's grave is located at a quiet corner of the Gu Garden

Thousand Lamp Museum
A unique exhibition with the town's namesake is Qiandeng Guan(Thousand Lamp Museum), with more than one thousand lamps, dated as early as Neolithic Age to modern times, spanning more than five thousand years.

References

 Qiandeng town

Kunshan
AAAA-rated tourist attractions
Tourist attractions in Suzhou
Township-level divisions of Jiangsu